Sid Roberson may refer to

Sid Roberson (baseball), American baseball player
Sidney Percy Roberson, British bodybuilder, actor and director